Carlos Javier Rodríguez (born 19 January 1992) is a Spanish professional footballer who plays for CD Ebro as a midfielder.

Football career
Born in Santa Cruz de Tenerife, Canary Islands, Javier graduated from Real Zaragoza's youth setup, and was subsequently loaned to SD Ejea. In June, however, he suffered a knee injury which took him out of the whole season.

Javier then returned to the Aragonese side, being assigned to the reserves in Segunda División B, but only contributed with ten appearances in the campaign due to another knee injury. In July 2012 he was released by Zaragoza and joined Andorra CF, in Tercera División.

On 3 July 2013 Javier moved back to the Blanquiazules, again being assigned to the B-side now in the fourth division. On 30 March of the following year he played his first match as a professional, replacing Barkero in a 2–2 draw at Deportivo Alavés in the Segunda División championship.

References

External links

1992 births
Living people
Spanish footballers
Footballers from Santa Cruz de Tenerife
Association football midfielders
Segunda División players
Segunda División B players
Tercera División players
Real Zaragoza B players
SD Ejea players
Real Zaragoza players
CD Ebro players